Presentation at the Temple may refer to one of two paintings by Tintoretto:
 Presentation at the Temple (Tintoretto, Carmini), c.1542
 Presentation at the Temple (Tintoretto, Gallerie dell'Accademia), 1554-1556